Myoporum laetum, commonly known as ngaio  or mousehole tree is a plant in the family Scrophulariaceae endemic to New Zealand, including the Chatham Islands. It is a fast growing shrub, readily distinguished from others in the genus by the transparent dots in the leaves which are visible when held to a light.

Description
It often appears dome-shaped at first but as it gets older, distorts as branches break off. The bark on older specimens is thick, corky and furrowed.

There are four stamens which extend slightly beyond the petal tube and the ovary is superior with 2 locules.

Taxonomy and naming
Myoporum laetum was first formally described in 1786 by Georg Forster in Florulae Insularum Australium Prodromus. The specific epithet is derived from the "Latin laetum, pleasant or bright".

Distribution and habitat
Ngaio grows very well in coastal areas of New Zealand including the Chatham Islands. It grows in lowland forest, sometimes in pure stands, others in association with other species such as nikau (Rhopalostylis sapida).

Ecology
Myoporum laetum has been introduced to several other countries including Portugal, South Africa and Namibia. It is considered an invasive exotic species by the California Exotic Pest Plant Council.

Uses

Indigenous use
The Māori would rub the leaves over their skin to repel mosquitoes and sandflies.

Horticulture
Ngaio is a hardy plant that will grow in most soils but needs full sun. It can also tolerate exposure to salt spray. It can be grown from seed or from semi-hard cuttings.

Toxicity
The leaves of this tree contain the liver toxin ngaione, which can cause sickness and or death in stock such as horses, cattle, sheep and pigs.

Māori legend

According to Māori legend, a Ngaio tree can be seen on the moon. Here is the story, as recounted by politician, historian, poet William Pember Reeves (1857–1932):

See also
Catherine Alexander (botanist)

References

laetum
Trees of New Zealand
Plants described in 1786
Moon myths
Flora of New Zealand